{{DISPLAYTITLE:C20H26N2O2}}
The molecular formula C20H26N2O2 (molar mass: 326.4 g/mol) may refer to:

 Ajmaline
 Dihydroquinidine
 Dihydroquinine
 Epsiprantel
 Tortuosamine
 Vincaminol